Waco is an unincorporated community in Giles County, Tennessee, formerly known as "Old Lynville". It is located at the crossroads of U.S. Route 31 and State Route 129.

References

Unincorporated communities in Giles County, Tennessee
Unincorporated communities in Tennessee